The 1952–53 Washington Huskies men's basketball team represented the University of Washington for the  NCAA college basketball season. Led by third-year head coach Tippy Dye, the Huskies were members of the Pacific Coast Conference and played their home games on campus at Hec Edmundson Pavilion in Seattle, Washington.

In the 22-team NCAA tournament, Washington won twice in Corvallis, Oregon, over Seattle and Santa Clara, and advanced to the Final Four in Kansas City, Missouri. In the semifinal against defending champion Kansas, the Huskies lost by 26 points in front of a partisan crowd, then defeated LSU by nineteen points in the consolation game to take third place. Indiana won the title by 

The Huskies were led on the floor by All-American center Bob Houbregs and guard Joe Cipriano, later the head coach at Idaho and Nebraska.

Washington's next NCAA Tournament appearance was 23 years later in 1976; their first National Invitation Tournament (NIT) appearance was

Postseason results

|-
!colspan=6 style=| Pacific Coast Conference Playoff Series

|-
!colspan=6 style=| NCAA tournament

Rankings

References

External links
Sports Reference – Washington Huskies: 1952–53 basketball season

Washington Huskies men's basketball seasons
Washington Huskies
NCAA Division I men's basketball tournament Final Four seasons
Washington
Washington
Washington